Epilogue to Capricorn is a British television mini-series. It was a six-part serial which aired in 1959. Cast included Jean Kent. It was produced by Associated Television and aired on ITV. Unlike most British television series of the 1950s, the series survives intact.

References

External links
Epilogue to Capricorn at IMDb

1959 British television series debuts
1959 British television series endings
1950s British drama television series
Black-and-white British television shows
English-language television shows
ITV television dramas
1950s British television miniseries